The voiceless palato-alveolar sibilant affricate or voiceless domed postalveolar sibilant affricate is a type of consonantal sound used in some spoken languages. It is familiar to English speakers as the "ch" sound in "chip".

Historically, this sound often derives from a former voiceless velar stop  (as in English church; also in Gulf Arabic, Slavic languages, Indo-Iranian languages and Romance languages), or a voiceless dental stop  by way of palatalization, especially next to a front vowel (as in English nature; also in Amharic, Portuguese, some accents of Egyptian, etc.).

Features
Features of the voiceless domed postalveolar affricate:

Occurrence

Mandarin Chinese, Russian, Japanese, Korean, Mongolian, Polish, Catalan, and Thai have a voiceless alveolo-palatal affricate ; this is technically postalveolar but it is less precise to use .

Related characters
There are several Unicode characters based on the tesh digraph (ʧ):
  is an IPA superscript letter
  is used in phonetic transcription
 has been used in phonetic descriptions of Polish

Voiceless postalveolar non-sibilant affricate

Features

 Its place of articulation is postalveolar, which means it is articulated with either the tip or the blade of the tongue behind the alveolar ridge.

Occurrence

Notes

References

External links
 

Postalveolar consonants
Affricates
Pulmonic consonants
Voiceless oral consonants
Central consonants